Stanton is an unincorporated community in Adams County, Mississippi. It is the nearest community to Emerald Mound site, a National Historic Landmark.

History
Stanton is located on a branch of the former Yazoo and Mississippi Valley Railroad. A post office operated under the name Stanton from 1884 to 1955.

References

Unincorporated communities in Adams County, Mississippi
Unincorporated communities in Mississippi
Unincorporated communities in Natchez micropolitan area